Xeodrifter is a Metroidvania video game developed by Renegade Kid. The game was first released for Nintendo 3DS and Microsoft Windows in 2014. A Wii U port of the game was released 2015, and after Gambitious Digital Entertainment acquired the rights to the Microsoft Windows version of the game, it was also released on PlayStation 4 and PlayStation Vita in 2015. A Nintendo Switch version was released in February 2018.

Gameplay 
Xeodrifter is a Metroidvania video game, where the player controls an astronaut whose spaceship is damaged by an asteroid, and must visit four nearby planets in order to repair it. The game allows the player to explore the planets, each representing a different environment. The planets can be visited in any order, but exploration depends on power-ups to gain access to new areas. The game draws inspiration from the Metroid series, and borrows elements from another Renegade Kid game, Mutant Mudds.

Reception 

Xeodrifter has been generally well received upon release, with critics praising its gameplay and mechanics, but criticizing its repetitive bosses and short length. The Nintendo 3DS version of the game holds an aggregated Metacritic score of  73/100 based on 17 critic reviews.

References

External links 
 

2014 video games
Action-adventure games
Nintendo 3DS eShop games
Nintendo Switch games
Platform games
PlayStation 4 games
PlayStation Network games
PlayStation Vita games
Science fiction video games
Side-scrolling video games
Indie video games
Single-player video games
Video games developed in the United States
Video games set on fictional planets
Wii U eShop games
Windows games
Metroidvania games